Hrvatski nogometni klub Hajduk Split is a Croatian association football club based in Split, which currently competes in the top tier division of Croatian football, Prva HNL. Founded in 1911, they played only friendlies during their first years in existence. Between the early 1920s and 1940, Hajduk regularly participated in the Kingdom of Yugoslavia national championship. The club spent their entire existence playing top-flight football, having been a member of Yugoslav First League from 1946 until its dissolution in 1991. Following the breakup of Yugoslavia the club joined the Croatian First League in its inaugural season in 1992.

Hajduk Split played their inaugural league fixture as part of the Croatian First League on 29 February 1992 against Istra. Since that game they have faced 38 different sides in league football with their most regular opponent having been Dinamo Zagreb.

Key
  Clubs with this background and symbol in the "Opponent" column are Hajduk Split's divisional rivals in the current season.
  Clubs with this background and symbol in the "Opponent" column are defunct.
The name used for each opponent is the name they had when Hajduk Split most recently played a league match against them. Results against each opponent include results against that club under any former name. For example, results against Dinamo Zagreb include matches played against Croatia Zagreb.
P = matches played; W = matches won; D = matches drawn; L = matches lost; F = goals for; A = goals against; Win% = percentage of total matches won
The columns headed "First" and "Last" contain the first and most recent seasons in which Hajduk Split played league matches against each opponent.

Yugoslav league all-time record (1946–1991)

Croatian league all-time record
Statistics correct as of match played 29 February 2020

Notes

A.  Croatia Sesvete went bankrupt during the 2011–12 season, the following season a new club by the name Croatia Prigorje was registered and entered Zagreb county league.
B.  Kamen Ingrad fell into financial difficulties after 2007–08 season and were dissolved in 2008.
C.  Karlovac went bankrupt following the 2011–12 season, the following season a new club by the name Karlovac 1919 was registered and entered Karlovac county league.
D.  Mladost 127 went bankrupt during the 1999–2000 season, new successor club by the name Suhopolje was founded later.
E.  Neretva fell into financial difficulties during the 2016–17 season and in May 2017, the club stepped out from Treća HNL South and were dissolved.
F.  Pomorac fell into financial difficulties during the 2013–14 season and in October 2014, the club stepped out from Druga HNL and were dissolved.
G.  Radnik Velika Gorica merged with local club Polet Buševec in summer 2009, and formed a new club by the name Gorica.
H.  Vukovar '91 fell into financial difficulties during the 2011–12 season and in January 2012, the club stepped out from Treća HNL East and were dissolved. A new club by the name Vukovar 1991 was registered and entered the Osijek-Vinkovci intercounty league the following season.

References
General
 
 

League Record By Opponent
Hajduk Split
Hajduk Split